Rakefet Remigolski (also "Remigolsky"; רקפת רמיגולסקי; born December 8, 1971) is an Israeli former Olympic rhythmic gymnast.

Rhythmic gymnastics career
She competed for Israel at the 1988 Summer Olympics in Seoul, South Korea, at the age of 16 in Rhythmic Gymnastics (as Israel's youngest competitor at the 1988 Olympics).  In Women's Individual All-Around she came in 37th, in Hoop she came in 38th, in Rope she came in tied for 28th, in Clubs she came in 36th, and in Ribbon she came in tied for 34th. When she competed in the Olympics she was 5-1.5 (157 cm) tall, and weighed 97 lbs (44 kg).

References

External links
 
 Olympic performance (1988) (video)

Living people
Gymnasts at the 1988 Summer Olympics
1971 births
Israeli rhythmic gymnasts
Olympic gymnasts of Israel